Mountain Home High School is a public high school in Mountain Home, Idaho, United States. The only traditional high school of the Mountain Home School District (#193).  It serves over 1,100 students in grades 9–12, from the city of Mountain Home and Mountain Home Air Force Base to the southwest.  MHHS is located at 300 South 11th East, and the principal is Sam Gunderson.

The current building opened in 1954, with several additions, the latest in 2009.  Previous buildings at other sites were built in 1926, 1905, and earlier, as yearbooks indicate MHHS graduates back to 1901. A three-year senior high school (10–12) for decades, freshman returned to the MHHS campus in 2009. The school colors are orange and black and the mascot is a  tiger.  The MHHS athletic teams compete in the Great Basin Conference (GBC) in IHSAA Class 4A, the state's second-highest enrollment classification (160–319 students per class year).

Mountain Home High School offers a prestigious speech and debate team, formerly run by Mr. John Petti, currently run by the illustrious and talented Ms. Jenn Shumway. Ms. Shumway is an excellent coach and her team is one of the best, currently ranked 49th in the nation.

MHHS is the largest high school in Elmore County, which includes Glenns Ferry, which competes in 2A (with a 1A enrollment).

State titles

Girls
 Softball (2): (4A) 2009, 2010  (introduced in 1997)

References

External links
Official site
MaxPreps.com- Mountain Home Tigers football
MaxPreps.com- Mountain Home Tigers boys basketball
Mountain Home School District #193

Public high schools in Idaho
Schools in Elmore County, Idaho
1954 establishments in Idaho
Mountain Home, Idaho